The Great Ray Charles is the second studio album by American musician Ray Charles, released in 1957 by Atlantic Records. An instrumental jazz album, it features cover art designed by Marvin Israel. Later CD re-issues of The Great Ray Charles often include six out of the eight songs from the 1961 album The Genius After Hours, as bonus tracks.

Release

The Great Ray Charles was released by Atlantic Records in August 1957. Due to frequent airplay of two tracks off the album, "Doodlin" and "Sweet Sixteen Bars", Atlantic released those two tracks as an EP later that same year.

Track listing

Original LP release

Note: Some sources list "Ain't Misbehavin" in place of "Black Coffee".

1987 CD reissue

Personnel
 Ray Charles – celesta, piano
 Oscar Pettiford, Roosevelt Sheffield – bass
 Joe Harris, William Peeples – drums
 David "Fathead" Newman – alto and tenor saxophone
 Emmot Dennis – baritone saxophone
 Joe Bridgewater – trumpet, soloist
 John Hunt – trumpet
Technical
 Earle Brown, Tom Dowd – recording engineer
 Marvin Israel – design
 Lee Friedlander – cover photography

Notes

References

1957 albums
Ray Charles albums
Albums produced by Jerry Wexler
Albums produced by Ahmet Ertegun
Atlantic Records albums